The 1999 Norwegian Figure Skating Championships was held at the Askerhallen in Asker from February 5 to 7, 1999. Skaters competed in the discipline of single skating. The results were used to choose the teams to the 1999 World Championships, the 1999 European Championships, the 1999 Nordic Championships, and the 1999 World Junior Championships.

Senior results

Ladies

Junior results

Ladies

References

External links
 results

Norwegian Figure Skating Championships
Norwegian Figure Skating Championships, 1999
1999 in Norwegian sport